Axel Axelsson may refer to:
 Axel Axelsson (handballer) (born 1951), Icelandic former handball player
 Axel Axelsson (footballer) (born 1942), Icelandic former footballer